Ramsey Branch is a stream in Cape Girardeau County, Missouri, in the United States. It is a tributary to the Castor River.

Ramsey Branch was named for Andrew Ramsay, an early settler.

See also
List of rivers of Missouri

References

Rivers of Cape Girardeau County, Missouri
Rivers of Missouri